Shifting Gears is a studio album by Nancy Sinatra, released on Sinatra's own Boots Enterprises label in 2013.

The album is a collection of previously unissued recordings from her vaults featuring her renditions of "big" ballads with sources from Broadway of the 1920s to pop hits of the 1970s. Sinatra has said that she sequenced the songs to tell the story of a love affair.

Track listing
Credits adapted from Nancy Sinatra's website.

References

External links
 

2013 albums
Nancy Sinatra albums
Albums arranged by Billy Strange
Albums produced by Billy Strange
Albums produced by Michael Lloyd (music producer)
Covers albums